Cecil B. Moore is a neighborhood in the North Philadelphia section of the city of Philadelphia, Pennsylvania, United States named after the late Philadelphia-based civil rights attorney and politician Cecil B. Moore. The district is loosely arranged around the main campus of Temple University. The neighborhood has gentrified due to an influx of Temple students during the past several years. The controversial term “Templetown” was coined by former Temple president Peter J. Liacouras, but has only recently come into wide use after a real estate development company adopted the name. Cecil B. Moore Avenue is the street running parallel to Oxford and Montgomery, intersecting with N. Broad Street in the neighborhood.

Demographics
The neighborhood consists of 17,012 males and 20,277 females.  The median age is 25.49.  The population has increased 6.7% from 2000 to 2014 and 1.1% from 2010 to 2014 to reach a total population of 37,289 in 2014.

Boundaries and population

The Cecil B. Moore neighborhood loosely extends from 6th Street to the east, York Street to the north, 17th Street to the west, and Girard Avenue to the south. The majority of its native residents are African Americans and Puerto Ricans, although Temple students of all races are a growing presence, with many living off campus and in the Cecil B. Moore community. 

Recently the renaissance of Progress Plaza shopping center can mainly be attributed to the economic impact of students within these borders, furthering Temple's expansion further south down broad street towards Center City. Furthermore, the purchase of the closed-down William Penn High School by the university, after redevelopment, will extend the footprint even further down Broad street towards Girard.

History
The region was named after Cecil Bassett Moore (April 2, 1915 – February 13, 1979) who was a Philadelphia lawyer, activists in the Civil Rights Movement who led the fight to integrate Girard College, president of the local NAACP, and member of Philadelphia's City Council.  Moore is best remembered for leading a picket against Girard College which led to the desegregation of that school. He was also a champion of a wide range of causes central to the Civil Rights Movement, including integration of schools and trade unions, and increased political and economic representation for poor African-Americans. He has been credited with helping to restore order after the unsettling vandalism and violence of the racially charged Columbia Avenue riot of 1964. During his tenure, membership in the local NAACP chapter expanded from 7,000 in 1962 to more than 50,000 within a few years.

Templetown naming controversy 
The Templetown nickname was widely used due to the influence of Temple University.  The name, however, was not approved by either Temple University or its surrounding community.  In October 2014 the Templetown name began to experience backlash from longtime local residents that became disgruntled due to 60 years of economic stagnation along the Cecil B. Moore corridor. The complaints were strong enough that Google  removed the name in favor of the Cecil B. Moore name.

Local institutions

Education
 Temple University (39,515)
 Girard College (Prep)  (300)

Transportation
 
The Cecil B. Moore neighborhood is served by two railroad stations:
 Cecil B. Moore transit station by the Broad Street Line
 North Broad and Temple University stations by the SEPTA Regional Rail

Cecil B. Moore Avenue stretches from Fairmount Park in the Strawberry Mansion Section of Philadelphia to its eastern terminus at Frankford Avenue in Kensington intersecting Broad Street (PA 611) at Temple University.

See also
 List of college towns

References

Neighborhoods in Philadelphia
Lower North Philadelphia
Temple University
Philadelphia